James Mays (born 1986) is an American-born naturalized Central African basketball player.

James Mays may also refer to:

James Henry Mays (1868–1926), U.S. Representative
James C. Mays (born 1953), Canadian historian
James Luther Mays (1921–2015), Old Testament scholar
James P. Mays, member of the South Carolina House of Representatives

See also
James May (disambiguation)